A mannequin is a life-sized model of the human figure, used especially in advertising and sales.

Mannequin may also refer to:

Film
Mannequin (1926 film), an American silent film starring Alice Joyce and Dolores Costello
Mannequin (1933 film), a British drama film directed by George A. Cooper
Mannequin (1937 film), a drama starring Joan Crawford and Spencer Tracy
Mannequin (1987 film), a comedy starring Andrew McCarthy and Kim Cattrall
 Mannequin Two: On the Move (1991 film), sequel to the 1987 film, starring Kristy Swanson

Music
"Mannequin", a DVD single by  Cradle of Filth
"Mannequin", a song by Britney Spears from Circus
"Mannequin", a song by Culture Club from Waking Up with the House on Fire
"Mannequin", a song by Katy Perry from One of the Boys
"Mannequin", a song by The Kids from "Fame"
"Mannequin", a song by Wild Strawberries on the album Bet You Think I'm Lonely
"Mannequin", a song by Wire from Pink Flag
"Mannequin", a song by The Kovenant from Animatronic
"Mannequin", a song by Pop Smoke featuring Lil Tjay from Meet the Woo 2

Other uses
Mannequin, a novel by J. Robert Janes

See also
Manikin (disambiguation)
Manakin, a family of bird species